The women's shot put event at the 2013 Summer Universiade was held on 10–11 July.

Medalists

On 12 August 2022, the results of Russian Irina Tarasova between July 2012 and July 2016 were annulled by the Athletics Integrity Unit for doping violation. This means that her gold medal in the women's shot put has been stripped.

Results

Qualification
Qualification: 17.00 m (Q) or at least 12 best (q) qualified for the final.

Final

References 

Shot Put
2013 in women's athletics
2013